Betina Fernanda Soriano (born 1 March 1994) is an Argentine policewoman and footballer who plays as a forward for Costa Rican club Sporting San José and the Argentina women's national team.

Early life
Soriano was born in Córdoba.

Club career
Soriano started playing football at 12, when she joined Belgrano. She has played in their first team until 2015. She then retired from football to focus on study and work. She was retired for three years and became a police officer during that time.

Soriano came back to football in early 2019 when she returned to Belgrano. Later that year, she moved to their rivals, Talleres. In early 2021, she signed for Sporting San José in Costa Rica.

International career
Soriano represented Argentina at the 2012 South American U-20 Women's Championship and 2012 FIFA U-20 Women's World Cup. She capped at senior level during the 2011 Pan American Games.

References

1994 births
Living people
Footballers from Córdoba, Argentina
Argentine women's footballers
Women's association football forwards
Belgrano (women) players
Argentina women's youth international footballers
Argentina women's international footballers
Footballers at the 2011 Pan American Games
Argentine expatriate sportspeople in Costa Rica
Expatriate women's footballers in Costa Rica